Guus de Seriere ( – ) was a Dutch male footballer. He was part of the Netherlands national football team, playing 2 matches. He played his first match on 2 April 1911.

See also
 List of Dutch international footballers

References

1893 births
1980 deaths
Dutch footballers
Netherlands international footballers
People from Probolinggo

Association footballers not categorized by position